Charles, Charlie, or Chuck Henry may refer to:

Sportsmen
Charlie Henry (baseball) (1900–1972), American Negro leagues baseball player
Charles Henry (basketball), Gonzaga basketball coach for the 1943–44 season
Charlie Henry (footballer, born 1962), English former footballer for Swindon Town, Torquay United, Northampton Town and Aldershot
Charles Henry (American football) (born 1964), former American football player
Charlie Henry (basketball, born 1985), coach in the Chicago Bulls' organization
Charlie Henry (footballer, born 1986), English footballer

Politicians
Charles L. Henry (1849–1927), U.S. Representative from Indiana
Sir Charles Henry, 1st Baronet (1860–1919), British Member of Parliament for Wellington, 1906–1918, and The Wrekin, 1918–1920
Charles Henry (Canadian politician) (1911–1989), Canadian Member of Parliament
Brad Henry (Charles Bradford Henry, born 1963), Governor of Oklahoma

Others
Charles Henry (librarian) (1859–1926), French librarian and editor
Charles Trumbo Henry (1902–1964), American artist
Charles H. Henry (1937–2016), American physicist
Chuck Henry (born 1946), U.S. TV presenter and newsreader
Charles J. Henry (born 1950), American librarian

See also